Piątkowa  is a village in the administrative district of Gmina Błażowa, within Rzeszów County, Subcarpathian Voivodeship, in southeastern Poland.

The village has a population of 960.

References

Villages in Rzeszów County